Roseland is an unincorporated community and census-designated place (CDP) in Indian River County, Florida, United States. The population was 1,472 at the 2010 census, down from 1,775 at the 2000 census. It is part of the Sebastian–Vero Beach Metropolitan Statistical Area.

Geography
Roseland is located in northern Indian River County at  (27.834594, -80.489264). It is bordered to the north by the St. Sebastian River, which forms the Brevard County line. The city of Sebastian is to the south, and unincorporated Micco is to the north, in Brevard County. To the east is the Indian River and Pelican Island National Wildlife Refuge.

U.S. Route 1 passes through the east side of Roseland, leading north  to Melbourne and south  to Vero Beach.

Demographics

As of the census of 2000, there were 1,775 people, 842 households, and 506 families residing in the CDP. The racial makeup of the CDP was 96.68% White, 0.23% African American, 0.28% Native American, 1.35% Asian, 0.56% from other races, and 0.90% from two or more races. Hispanic or Latino of any race were 1.24% of the population.

There were 842 households, out of which 15.1% had children under the age of 18 living with them, 50.8% were married couples living together, 6.8% had a female householder with no husband present, and 39.8% were non-traditional families or individuals. 34.0% of all households were made up of individuals, and 20.7% had someone living alone who was 65 years of age or older.  The average household size was 2.05 and the average family size was 2.58.

In the CDP, the population was spread out, with 13.2% under the age of 18, 4.7% from 18 to 24, 19.0% from 25 to 44, 27.5% from 45 to 64, and 35.6% who were 65 years of age or older.  The median age was 54 years. For every 100 females, there were 93.4 males.  For every 100 females age 18 and over, there were 92.0 males.

The median income for a household in the CDP was $28,188, and the median income for a family was $34,853. Males had a median income of $30,326 versus $27,188 for females. The per capita income for the CDP was $18,084.  About 9.1% of families and 18.7% of the population were below the poverty line, including 42.2% of those under age 18 and 7.2% of those age 65 or over.

Notable person
Arlo Guthrie, the folk singer of Alice's Restaurant, owns a home here. After the hurricanes, Frances and Jeanne in 2004, the house was damaged. Guthrie contended with the county over repair work done to the home.

References

Census-designated places in Indian River County, Florida
Unincorporated communities in Indian River County, Florida
Populated places on the Intracoastal Waterway in Florida